The European side of Turkey is called the Thrace Basin. It is the largest and thickest Cenozoic sedimentary basin in Turkey.  The basin is triangular shaped, trends WNW-ESE and was formed by extension in late Middle Eocene to latest Oligocene times. This gas prone basin is located northwest of Istanbul, Turkey.

Structure 

About 9,000 meters of Eocene-Miocene marine clastics and continental sediments were deposited.  Several basement faults were reactivated and underwent strike-slip motion in late Miocene times where the famous North Anatolian Fault bounds the southern part of the basin. The Cenozoic sedimentary succession, overlying Paleozoic to Mesozoic metamorphic basement, comprises interbedded fine to coarse grained clastics from a variety of depositional environments, turbidite, muddy carbonates with local reef developments, river channels and tuffs.

Reserves 

More than 400 wells were drilled till 2008; 14 gas and 3 oil fields were discovered and all of them are producing. Main gas productions zones are between Eocene- Oligocene deposits; Hamitabat (turbiditic sandstones), Ceylan (tuffs), Sogucak (reefal limestone), and Osmancik (deltaic sandstone) formations.  Shales of Hamitabat and Mezardere formations have good source potentials.

External links
 More information about the Geology of Turkey.

Geology of Turkey
Geography of Thrace
Sedimentary basins of Europe